The Archdiocese of São Paulo is a Latin Metropolitan Archbishopric of the Roman Catholic Church in Brazil.
 
The Archdiocese is currently headed by Odilo Scherer since his appointment by Pope Benedict XVI on 21 March 2007, an appointment that ended almost four decades of Franciscan leadership in the archdiocese: both predecessors, Cardinals Paulo Evaristo Arns and Cláudio Hummes, belonged to that Order.

Its cathedral episcopal see, the Catedral Metropolitana Nossa Senhora da Assunção e São Paulo, in the metropolis São Paulo, was dedicated to the Assumption of Mary on September 5, 1964.
The city also has three minor basilicas : Basílica de Nossa Senhora da Assunção, Basílica de Nossa Senhora do Carmo (both also Marian) and Basílica do Santíssimo Sacramento (dedicated to the Holly Sacrament).

History 
 The Diocese of São Paulo was erected by Pope Benedict XIV on 6 December 1745, on vast territory split off from the then Diocese of São Sebastião do Rio de Janeiro.
 It lost territories on April 27, 1892 to establish the Diocese of Curitiba and on August 9, 1907 to establish the Diocese of Campanha.
 It became a Metropolitan Archdiocese on June 7, 1908, having lost more territories to establish the Dioceses of Botucatu, Campinas, Ribeirão Preto, São Carlos do Pinhal and Taubaté. 
 It lost further territories to establish more Dioceses : Sorocaba Santos, Bragança Paulista, Santo André, Metropolitan Aparecida, Diocese of Mogi das Cruzes, Jundiaí, Campo Limpo, Osasco, Santo Amaro and São Miguel Paulista.
 It enjoyed papal visits from Pope John Paul II in July 1980 and Pope Benedict XVI in May 2007.

Bishops

Ordinaries

Bishops of São Paulo
 Bernardo Rodrigues Nogueira (1745–1748 )
 Antônio da Madre de Deus Galvão, O.F.M. (1750–1764)
 Manuel da Ressurreição, O.F.M. (1771–1789)
 Miguel da Madre de Deus da Cruz, O.F.M. (1791–1795), appointed Archbishop of Braga (Portugal)
 Mateus de Abreu Pereira (1795–1824)
 Manuel Joaquim Gonçalves de Andrade (1827–1847)
 Antônio Joaquim de Melo (1851–1861)
 Sebastião Pinto do Rego (1861–1868)
 Lino Deodato Rodrigues de Carvalho (1871–1894)
 Joaquim Arcoverde de Albuquerque Cavalcanti (1894–1897), appointed Archbishop of São Sebastião do Rio de Janeiro (Cardinal in 1905)
 Antônio Cândido Alvarenga (1898–1903
 José de Camargo Barros (1903–1906)
 Leopoldo Duarte e Silva (1906–1908)

Archbishops of São Paulo
 Leopoldo Duarte e Silva (1908–1938) 
 José Gaspar d'Afonseca e Silva (1939–1943)
 Cardinal Carlos Carmelo de Vasconcelos Motta (1944–1964), appointed Archbishop of Aparecida
 Cardinal Agnelo Rossi (1964–1970), appointed Prefect of Congregation for the Propagation of the Faith and later President of Administration of the Patrimony of the Apostolic See
 Cardinal Paulo Evaristo Arns, O.F.M. (1970–1998)
 Cardinal Cláudio Hummes, O.F.M. (1998–2006), appointed Prefect of the Congregation for the Clergy
 Cardinal Odilo Scherer (2007–present)

Coadjutor Bishops
 Joaquim Arcoverde de Albuquerque Cavalcanti (1892–1894); future Cardinal
Antônio Maria Alves de Siqueira (1957-1966), did not succeed to see; appointed Coadjutor Archbishop of Campinas, Sao Paulo

Auxiliary Bishops
 José Gaspar d'Afonseca e Silva (1935–1939), appointed Archbishop here
Antônio Maria Alves de Siqueira (1947-1957), appointed Coadjutor here
Paulo Rolim Loureiro (1948-1962), appointed Bishop of Mogi das Cruzes, Sao Paulo
Antônio Ferreira de Macedo, C.SS.R. (1955-1964), appointed Coadjutor Archbishop of Aparecida, Sao Paulo
Vicente Angelo José Marchetti Zioni (1955-1964), appointed Bishop of Bauru, Sao Paulo
Romeu Alberti (1964-1965), appointed Bishop of Apucarana, Parana in 1965
Gabriel Paulino Bueno Couto, O. Carm. (1965-1966), appointed Bishop of Jundiaí, Sao Paulo
Paulo Evaristo Arns, O.F.M. (1966-1970), appointed Archbishop here (Cardinal in 1973)
Bruno Maldaner (1966-1971), appointed Bishop of Frederico Westphalen, Rio Grande do Sul
José Thurler (1966-1992)
Lucas Moreira Neves, O.P. (1967-1974), appointed Vice President of the Pontifical Council for the Laity; future Cardinal
Benedito de Ulhôa Vieira (1971-1978), appointed Archbishop of Uberaba, Minas Gerais
Angélico Sândalo Bernardino (1974-2000), appointed Bishop of Blumenau, Santa Catarina
Mauro Morelli (1974-1981), appointed Bishop of Duque de Caxias, Rio de Janeiro
Joel Ivo Catapan, S.V.D. (1974-1999)
Francisco Manuel Vieira (1974-1989), appointed Bishop of Osasco, Sao Paulo
Antônio Celso Queiroz (1975-2000), appointed Bishop of Catanduva, Sao Paulo
Luciano Pedro Mendes de Almeida, S.J. (1976-1988), appointed Archbishop of Mariana, Minas Gerais
Fernando José Penteado (1979-2000), appointed Bishop of Jacarezinho, Parana
Alfredo Ernest Novak, C.SS.R. (1979-1989), appointed Bishop of Paranaguá, Parana
Décio Pereira (1979-1997), appointed Bishop of Santo André, Sao Paulo
Antônio Gaspar (1982-2000), appointed Bishop of Barretos, Sao Paulo
Gil Antônio Moreira (1999-2004), appointed Bishop of Jundiaí, Sao Paulo
Odilo Pedro Scherer (2001-2007), appointed Archbishop here (Cardinal later in the year)
Benedito Beni dos Santos (2001-2006), appointed Bishop of Lorena, Sao Paulo
Manuel Parrado Carral (2001-2008), appointed Bishop of São Miguel Paulista, Sao Paulo
Pedro Luiz Stringhini (2001-2009), appointed Bishop of Franca, Sao Paulo
José Benedito Simão (2001-2009), appointed Bishop of Assis, Sao Paulo 
José María Pinheiro (2003-2005), appointed	Bishop of Bragança Paulista, Sao Paulo
Tomé Ferreira da Silva (2005-2012), appointed Bishop of São José do Rio Preto, Sao Paulo
Joaquim Justino Carreira (2005-2011), appointed Bishop of Guarulhos, Sao Paulo
João Mamede Filho, O.F.M. (2006-2010), appointed Bishop of Umuarama, Parana
Tarcísio Scaramussa, S.D.B. (2008-2014), appointed Coadjutor Bishop of Santos, Sao Paulo
Milton Kenan Júnior (2009-2014), appointed Bishop of Barretos, Sao Paulo
Edmar Perón (2009-2015), appointed Bishop of Paranaguá, Parana
Júlio Endi Akamine, S.A.C. (2011-2016), appointed Archbishop of Sorocaba, Sao Paulo
Sérgio de Deus Borges (2012-2019), appointed Bishop of Foz do Iguaçu, Parana
Devair Araújo da Fonseca (2014-)
José Roberto Fortes Palau (2014-2019), appointed Bishop of Limeira, Sao Paulo
Carlos Lema Garcia (2014-)
Eduardo Vieira dos Santos (2014-)
Luiz Carlos Dias (2016-)
José Benedito Cardoso (2019-)
Jorge Pierozan (2019-)
Ângelo Ademir Mezzari, R.C.J. (2020-

Other priests of this diocese who became bishops
José Marcondes Homem de Melo, appointed Bishop of Belém do Pará in 1906
Francisco de Campos Barreto, appointed Bishop of Pelotas, Rio Grande do Sul in 1911
Sebastião Leme da Silveira Cintra, appointed Auxiliary Bishop of São Sebastião do Rio de Janeiro in 1911; future Cardinal
Benedito Paulo Alves de Souza, appointed Bishop of Espírito Santo in 1918
Manuel da Silveira d’Elboux, appointed Auxiliary Bishop of Ribeirão Preto in 1940
Antônio de Castro Mayer, appointed Coadjutor Bishop of Campos, Rio de Janeiro in 1948
José Lafayette Ferreira Álvares, appointed Bishop of Bragança Paulista, Sao Paulo in 1971
Geraldo Majella Agnelo, appointed Bishop of Toledo, Parana in 1978; future Cardinal
Antônio Carlos Rossi Keller, appointed Bishop of Frederico Westphalen, Rio Grande do Sul in 2008
José Aparecido Gonçalves de Almeida (priest here, 1986-1989), appointed Auxiliary Bishop of Brasília, Distrito Federal in 2013

Province 
Its ecclesiastical province comprises the Metropolitan's own Archdiocese and these Suffragan bishoprics, mostly Latin too, but also a few Eastern Catholic, notably Byzantine Rite :
 Diocese of Campo Limpo
 Diocese of Guarulhos
 Diocese of Mogi das Cruzes
 Diocese of Osasco
 Diocese of Santo Amaro
 Diocese of Santo André
 Diocese of Santos
 Diocese of São Miguel Paulista Maronite Eparchy of Nossa Senhora do Líbano em São Paulo  Eparchy of Nossa 
Senhora do Paraíso em São Paulo

See also 
 List of Roman Catholic dioceses in Brazil

References

Sources and external links
 
 GCatholic.org with incumbent biography links
 Catholic Hierarchy

Roman Catholic dioceses in Brazil
Roman Catholic ecclesiastical provinces in Brazil
 
Religious organizations established in 1745
Roman Catholic dioceses and prelatures established in the 18th century
1745 establishments in Brazil